Wolfgang Köpcke (born 27 February 1948) is a German modern pentathlete. He competed for West Germany at the 1976 Summer Olympics, finishing in 41st place.

References

1948 births
Living people
German male modern pentathletes
Olympic modern pentathletes of West Germany
Modern pentathletes at the 1976 Summer Olympics
Sportspeople from Berlin